Nokona carulifera is a moth of the family Sesiidae. It is only known from Kuranda in Queensland, but probably occurs throughout the western coastal regions of Queensland.

The length of the forewings is about 11 mm for males and about 13 mm for females.

Taxonomy
Nokona coracodes was placed as a synonym of Nokona carulifera, but was reinstated as a valid species in 2001.

External links
Australian Faunal Directory
Image at CSIRO Entomology
Classification of the Superfamily Sesioidea (Lepidoptera: Ditrysia)
New records and a revised checklist of the Australian clearwing moths (Lepidoptera: Sesiidae)

Moths of Australia
Sesiidae
Moths described in 1919